"The Mark of Archanon" is the eighth episode of the second series of Space: 1999 (and the thirty-second episode overall of the programme).  The screenplay was written by Lew Schwarz; the director was Charles Crichton.  The final shooting script is dated 12 April 1976, with amendments dated 21 April, 26 April, 27 April and 28 April 1976.  Live action filming took place Tuesday 4 May 1976 through Tuesday 18 May 1976.

Story 
It is 640 days after leaving Earth orbit, and Alan Carter sings an absurd ditty as he strides through an underground mining gallery beneath Moonbase Alpha.  Mineralogist Andy Johnson leads the way, searching for dylenide crystals (a component in the Eagles' atmosphere-scrubbing filters).  The two mates banter as they set up a sonarscope and begin probing the cavern walls for the mineral.  Johnson soon detects a mineral formation that is definitely not dylenide.  Using the 'scope's thermal cutter, they uncover a transparent cabinet—containing two persons.

The occupants are humanoid—a man and an adolescent boy—standing immobile and apparently lifeless.  Carter, thinking he sees movement within the cabinet, tries to brush away dust for a better look.  Before his hand touches the glass, he is thrown back by a powerful force-field.  As Johnson kneels to check on Carter, he glances at the aliens—and is shocked to see the adult's eyes are open, glaring at him with a burning intensity.

Rescue and medical teams arrive.  Carter recovers from the shock while the others continue excavating the alien chamber.  Despite the astronaut's insistence he saw the man's eyes open, scans of the aliens show no sign of life.  With an internal temperature of 4° Celsius, the cabinet is definitely not a cryogenic suspension unit.  Tony Verdeschi spies a familiar symbol etched in the glass, recognizing it from a past planetfall on Krom Two.  Known as Flammon the 'Death Glow', Helena Russell states the symbol was left by a visiting god-like race to warn the indigenous population of areas containing life-threatening danger. (This 'Krom Two/Flammon' dialog between Tony and Helena is purely plot exposition, not a reference to any past filmed episode as there isn't one containing these elements.)

When focused on the adult for a longer span of time, the equipment records a greatly protracted heartbeat and a minuscule increase in the volume of air in the lungs—he is alive.  The aliens are being held in a state of suspended animation.  A second artefact is uncovered next to the cabinet: a control panel and power source.  However, the excavations have weakened the cavern roof.  With the ceiling collapsing, Verdeschi blindly manipulates the control panel and manages to deactivate the force-field.  The adult alien is pulled to safety as the now-unprotected cabinet is smashed by falling debris.  Carter risks his life by re-entering the cave-in to bring out the boy.

Though still unconscious, the aliens' vital signs quickly normalise.  Helena and her assistant doctor, Raul Nuñez, tend to the youth.  Unobserved, the man wakes and reaches for a discarded pick-axe.  As he regards the Alphans with increasing hostility, a representation of the 'Flammon' danger symbol glows into existence beneath the skin of his forehead.  When he hears the boy is safe, both his anger and the symbol fade before he again loses consciousness.  The two are taken to the Medical Centre, where tests conclude their physiology to be borderline human.

When left alone in a supposedly sedated sleep, the man, known as Pasc, rises.  He awakens the boy, his son Etrec.  The youth is terrified his forehead also bears the symbol and asks his father to kill him so it cannot come.  Pasc, face contorted with a psychotic rage, the symbol pulsing on his forehead, reaches for Etrec's neck—but cannot bring himself to strangle his son.  Instead, he wraps his head with a bandage to hide the damning mark from sight.

From Command Centre, Verdeschi and Helena transmit news of the discovery to John Koenig on Eagle One.  The Commander is leading a long-range survey mission in an area of space designated 'Blue Quadrant'.  At present, his ship is traversing a dense asteroid storm and contact is marginal.  As for the aliens, Koenig insists all security procedures be strictly observed.  The discussion is interrupted by the sudden entrance of Pasc and Etrec.  Pasc deflects Helena's questions about the bandage and his 'wound' by telling her a man's blood holds spiritual significance on Archanon and cannot be viewed by strangers.

On the Eagle, Maya recognises the name 'Archanon', also known as the 'Planet of Peace', before the storm cuts communications.  Pasc informs them his people long ago outlawed violence, replacing evil with good.  They sent forth emissaries throughout the universe to teach their philosophy.  However, it was not until arriving at Earth that they met with total failure.  Apart from he and Etrec, the entire team was driven to madness by humanity's unparalleled brutality.  Led by Pasc's wife Lyra, the madmen imprisoned father and son in the stasis chamber.  The mutineers then left to revel in their madness.  During this, Etrec is silent as his father blatantly lies about the circumstances leading to their incarceration.

When asked why they were not killed, Pasc replies it is psychologically impossible for an Archanon to take a life.  Any further questions are prevented when Etrec passes out.  A concerned Carter carries the boy to Medical, but Helena can find nothing wrong.  When Etrec comes to, he announces he is hungry.  Fond of children, Carter befriends the alien boy.  The astronaut chalks the faint up to Etrec not having eaten for a thousand years.   Suggesting they go for a hamburger, Carter offers to carry the lad.  After initially refusing, Etrec leaps on him piggy-back style as he sees Pasc approaching the astronaut from behind, a pair of surgical scissors raised to stab him in the back.

Carter continues to bond with Etrec, teaching the boy to play rugby.  The two are called to the Technical Section, where the staff is trying to analyse the stasis chamber's power unit.  Though the boy's scientific knowledge surpasses the Alphans, he defers to his father.  Pasc feigns ignorance; as commander, he says he relied on his specialists for these matters.  The unit is opened and a monitor transmitter is found inside.  Pasc's startled reaction goes unnoticed as Helena calls the techlab, asking for the Archanons to report to Medical.

They leave, but Pasc drags Etrec toward the Embarkation Area instead.  The transmitter was active—their people know they are free.  They must flee before any Archanon officials arrive.  Intending to steal the stand-by Eagle, Pasc knocks out the pilot, hiding his body in a storeroom.  While waiting for their patients, Helena and Nuñez review their findings.  A virus exists in both Archanons' systems—active in Pasc, dormant in Etrec.  Perhaps not coincidentally, recordings of Pasc's brain waves show a series of distortions not present in the boy's.  Blood samples are required for further analysis.

Helena pages the tech-lab again and is told Pasc and Etrec left some time earlier.  Security men are dispatched to locate the lost aliens, who are found as they board a travel tube servicing the launch pads.  During this, Carter and Johnson examine the Archanon device.  An open panel contains a video-screen; inside are a series of rods that could be recording units.  Plugging one into a matching slot starts a playback of Pasc's log.  Ebullient, Johnson sees Pasc and Etrec outside the techlab, being escorted to the Medical Section.  He calls them over to witness the discovery.

Without warning, Pasc lashes out, his powerful blow connecting with Johnson's head.  Carter sounds the alarm before the homicidal alien grabs him by the throat.  In the scuffle, the bandage is torn from Pasc's head and Carter sees the symbol.  Etrec tries to stop his father, but Pasc one-handedly chokes Carter while simultaneously pummeling him.  Carter goes limp and Etrec believes him killed.  The aliens depart seconds before Verdeschi and a Security squad arrive.  Carter comes to, but the critically injured Johnson requires medical care.

When responding to the emergency call, Helena is taken hostage by Pasc and held at gunpoint with her own weapon.  Carter snatches the boy out of harm's way, but Verdeschi presses his stun-gun to Etrec's head.  Each man threatens to kill his respective hostage, but Pasc knows humans are too weak to kill in cold blood.  When asked what became of the Archanons' abhorrence to violence, Etrec reveals his father has the dreaded 'killing sickness', as denoted by the mark on his forehead.  Bartering with Helena's life, Pasc demands access to the stand-by Eagle.  Verdeschi concedes, but Etrec opts to remain on Alpha.  Pasc tries to kill his son for his disobedience but, again, cannot follow through.

Boarding Eagle Three, Pasc finds the controls deactivated by command order.  Helena attempts to learn more about the killing sickness, which she equates with the active virus discovered in his system.  While Verdeschi and staff try to determine the best way to board the Eagle unobserved, Pasc calls in.  He demands the ship's controls be unlocked and Etrec brought to him in exchange for the doctor.  She blurts out a message for Nuñez, but is cut off by Pasc.  Nuñez speculates it had to do with their needing blood samples to analyse the virus.  Verdeschi sends a reluctant Carter to convince the boy to first give blood, then consent to leave with his father if necessary.

In the Recreation Centre, Carter finds Etrec in the throes of the killing sickness.  Forehead pulsing with the hated symbol, the boy turns on his friend, a steak-knife poised to strike.  Instead he plunges it into his own forehead, trying to gouge out the shameful mark.  Before collapsing, he offers his blood to Carter.  During this, an alien spacecraft approaches the Moon.  It hails from Archanon, having come to warn the Alphans of the danger posed by their freed kinsmen.  Growing weaker, Etrec asks for the Archanon device.  Another recording reveals the missing pieces of the puzzle.

Verdeschi contacts Pasc, but instead of meeting his demands, he replays the recording for Helena's benefit.  Pasc's wife, Lyra, relates how Pasc was discovered to have the neurological pathogen known as the killing sickness.  After murdering two of their team, he was overpowered.  A stasis chamber was prepared and, knowing susceptibility to the disease is carried in the genes of the male line, both husband and son were imprisoned until a cure was found.  As Pasc watches his wife's tear-stained face, Nuñez tells Helena the virus is curable.  He has prepared a serum from the boy's blood...but Etrec seems incapable of replacing the blood volume he has lost.

Pasc is devastated; with Etrec dying, he is left with nothing.  He threatens to kill Helena unless the Eagle is released. Helena pleads with him to save his son by giving him a blood transfusion.  The virus can be killed by first treating his blood with the serum.  He refuses—he does not save life, he takes it...even his own son's.  She berates him for his cowardice, running rather than fighting for the life of his child.  Unexpectedly, Pasc agrees to the procedure.  The transfusion is performed and Etrec's condition improves.  Pasc, however, is fading fast.

An Archanon woman, Maurna, is escorted from her ship to the care unit.  Father and son gape at the striking resemblance she bears to Lyra.  She is told of Helena's cure for the killing sickness, and reveals this procedure is known on Archanon. Physiologically unable to produce blood rapidly, no Archanon could give the amount required to prepare the serum and survive. With irony, Pasc tells Helena it is the privilege of the killing sickness to at last kill one's self, and he expires.  Maurna, a descendant of Lyra, takes the cured Etrec into her care.  Before they depart, a wistful Carter presents the boy with his rugby ball as a memento.

Days later, Koenig returns from the Blue Quadrant survey and consoles a brooding Helena.  As a physician, she does not feel that ignorance is a satisfactory defence for malpractice.  Koenig reminds her she should be grateful for curing the boy.  She admits she is grateful for that...and for other things, as she kisses him.

Cast

Starring 
Martin Landau — Commander John Koenig
Barbara Bain — Doctor Helena Russell

Also Starring 
Catherine Schell — Maya

Featuring 
Tony Anholt — Tony Verdeschi
Nick Tate — Captain Alan Carter

Guest Stars 
John Standing — Pasc
 Michael Gallagher — Etrec

Also Featuring 
 Veronica Lang — Lyra and Maurna
John Alkin — Andy Johnson
 John Hug — Astronaut Bill Fraser
 Anthony Forrest — Security Guard Carson
 Raul Newney — Doctor Raul Nuñez
Yasuko Nagazumi — Yasko

Uncredited Artists 
Annie Lambert — Command Centre Operative
 Quentin Pierre — Security Guard (Pierce)
Terry Walsh — Eagle Three Astronaut (Stuart)
Barbara Kelly — Computer Voice

Music 

The score was re-edited from previous Space: 1999 incidental music tracks composed for the second series by Derek Wadsworth and draws primarily from the scores of "The Metamorph" and "The Exiles".

Production Notes 
 With Sir Lew Grade's late renewal order for the second series, a strict ten-month production schedule was imposed by ITC New York.  To stay on schedule, producer Fred Freiberger devised the 'double-up' concept.  Two episodes would be filmed simultaneously by two first-unit companies.  The scripts would be written to heavily feature one of the stars; the other would appear in a reduced capacity while working on their own, concurrent story.  The supporting cast would also be divided between the two productions.
 In the case of this 'Helena Double-Up' script, Barbara Bain was the featured star with supporting actors Nick Tate and Tony Anholt joining her for a story set primarily in the standing Moonbase sets on Stage 'L'.  Short scenes involving Martin Landau and Catherine Schell were filmed in the Eagle command module, with Landau and Bain appearing together on-screen only in the epilogue.  ('The Rules of Luton' was filmed simultaneously on location, with Landau and Schell receiving the majority of the screen time.)
 "The Mark of Archanon" shooting script dated 12 April 1976 contained scenes either cut for time or revised by the subsequent amendments:  (1) The use of dylenide crystals in the Eagles' air filters was mentioned in dialogue between Carter and Johnson during the hook.  (2) The cave-in would be an accident caused by a careless technician; when not in use, the thermal cutter was left turned on and pointing at the ceiling; (3) Carter's use of the nickname 'Bluey' for Johnson was explained as Australian slang for people with red hair; (4) The plan to gain access to Pasc's Eagle by burning through the propulsion-tube's inspection hatch with acid was visualised and carried out by two Alphans.  This sequence was removed for budgetary reasons; (5) The new character of Raul Nuñez was created when a scheduling conflict would prevent actor Jeffery Kissoon from portraying Ben Vincent, as intended by the script.
 In an attempt to appeal to the American audience, the voices of Michael Gallagher (Etrec), John Alkin (Andy Johnson) and Anthony Forrest (Carson) were dubbed by voice-artists speaking with American accents.  This is not actually true, as the voices were dubbed due to the fact that the actors had heavy colds at the time.  Both Gallagher and Aikin redubbed their own lines later when the colds had been cured.  (In fact Gallagher can be seen either coughing or sneezing on the rugby ball when given it by Alan Carter.)  (This comes from both the DVD version of Space 1999 and IDBM)

Novelisation 

The episode was adapted in the second Year Two Space: 1999 novel Mind-Breaks of Space by Michael Butterworth and J. Jeff Jones published in 1977.  The story would be adapted from the 12 April 1976 shooting script and contained many of the unrevised and deleted items present in this draft.

References

External links 
Space: 1999 - "The Mark of Archanon" - The Catacombs episode guide
Space: 1999 - "The Mark of Archanon" - Moonbase Alpha's Space: 1999 page

1976 British television episodes
Space: 1999 episodes